Horse the Band (stylized as HORSE the band) is an American metalcore band from Lake Forest, California, who are best known for their 8-bit video game-influenced sound combined with metalcore. Frontman Nathan Winneke once jokingly described their sound as "Nintendocore", although the band have gone to lengths to distance themselves from the label, reiterating that this merely describes the sound, not the substance.

Biography

Early years and R. Borlax (1998–2004)
HORSE the Band was started in Lake Forest, California, in 1998 while founding members Erik Engstrom and David Isen were attending El Toro High School. The original lineup included vocalists Adam Crook and Risto Metso, drummer Jason Karuza and bassist Jason Roberts. At the time, the band had a more traditional hardcore punk style. From late 2000 onwards, the band had a stable lineup with Engstrom and Isen, vocalist Adam Crook, drummer Jason Karuza and bassist Nathan Winneke, who had previously stood in as drummer for Karuza, and recorded their self-produced album Secret Rhythm of the Universe in 2001.

The band booked its own tours starting the summer of 2002, including a three-month tour spanning seven countries, and also released the EP Beautiful Songs by Men. In late 2002, vocalist Adam Crook left the band so that he could continue his formal education. Following his departure, bassist Nathan Winneke took over vocal duties, while Andy Stokes replaced him on bass.

In 2003, HORSE the Band released their first "proper" album with R. Borlax, featuring many new recordings of older songs. Drummer Jason Karuza left the band shortly after its release. His full-time replacement, Eli Green, joined after the band had toured in support of the album.

The Mechanical Hand and A Natural Death (2004–2008)
In the summer of 2004, they embarked upon the Horse the World Tour 2004, giving way to 85 shows in 90 days, spanning seven countries throughout North America and Europe. After the tour, Andy Stokes left the band, and Dashiel Arkenstone became the band's new bassist. With the new lineup of Engstrom, Isen, Winneke, Green, and Arkenstone, the band recorded and released their second album The Mechanical Hand (2005).

In 2006, the band embarked on both Warped Tour and Sounds of the Underground. The band abruptly dropped off the "Stampeding Machines" tour with Gatsby's American Dream and Portugal. the Man and recorded a concept EP titled Pizza. The band stated on their Myspace that "We left that tour because we ate really, really, really good pizza in Lou Malnati's in Chicago with Dave's grandparents. The pizza was such that we were inspired by God to write music of the kind not heard in this world since Mozart was fed his first currywurst," though astute fans noticed that Eli Green was no longer in the band, having been replaced by Chris Prophet. The band released their fourth album A Natural Death in 2007.

Earth Tour and Desperate Living (2008–2010)

In early 2008, Prophet was asked to leave the band. In March, the band embarked on their "Earth Tour", a self-funded, self-booked, and self-promoted tour of 47 countries in 90 days. The band was able to complete the tour with the help of drummer Jon Karel from The Number 12 Looks Like You. The band released a ten-hour, seven-DVD film chronicling their travels in 2010. The film was submitted to SXSW and Sundance but was not screened, and was later released for free online. Bassist Dashiel Arkenstone left the band after the tour, though he remains on good terms with the remaining members. Drummer Jon Karel, having been hired as a substitute, returned to his activities in The Number 12 Looks Like You, leaving only Engstrom, Isen and Winneke.

On February 2, 2009, HORSE the Band signed to Vagrant Records, a label they stated they had been trying to sign with for nine years. The band's most recent full-length album, Desperate Living, was released on October 6, 2009, with new drummer Daniel Pouliot and bassist Brian Grover. Grover left the band shortly after the band wrapped up touring in support of Desperate Living and was replaced by current bassist Jeremiah Bignell.

Future and Your Fault (2011–present)

The band went on an extended unannounced hiatus, reforming every few months for sporadic runs of shows. In March 2017, HORSE the Band toured with Infinity Shred and Graf Orlock, closing out their sets with their first new song in eight years. The song was referred to by fans as "A Reason to Live" after a recurring hashtag on the band's social media during the tour. After wrapping up the tour, on July 14, 2017, the band posted an in-studio video of the song on their Instagram account, followed by two more studio videos, indicating that the group could be possibly recording a new release, which would be their first material in a decade (following 2009's Desperate Living).

In February 2018, the band announced a new EP on their Facebook and Instagram  accounts. The EP, also referred to by fans as "A Reason to Live", was to be crowdfunded by Ethereum smart contract, which would disburse Ether cryptocurrency to the band members as payment for making progress on the album. It is unknown if the band met their funding goal and their social media returned to its previous period of inactivity - issues with funding via Ether cryptocurrency were likely exacerbated by the 2018 cryptocurrency crash shortly after the band announced the campaign.

In December 2019, the band announced three shows on the "A Partridge" Tour, during which they played "A Reason to Live" and another new song, later identified as "NoGimbus". Winneke stated on his Instagram that the new EP was in the process of being mixed and mastered, but no further details were released by the band or its members.

In October 2020, after being teased on the band members' personal Instagram pages, a new three-song EP, Your Fault, was announced on the band's Instagram and other social media profiles for release on November 27. It is the band's first new release in over a decade and contains the two songs played on tour, "A Reason to Live" and "NoGimbus", as well as a cover of Nine Inch Nails' "March of the Pigs".

Members 

Current
 Erik Engstrom – keyboards, LSDJ, backing vocals (1998–present), guitar (2000–2001)
 David Isen – guitars, backing vocals (1998–present)
 Nathan Winneke – lead vocals (2002–present), bass (2001–2002), drums (2000–2001)
 Daniel Pouliot – drums (2008–present), bass (2004)
 Jeremiah Bignell – bass (2010–present)

Touring musicians

 Ed Edge – triangle (2005–present)
 Mike Benitez – bass (2002)
 Alex Duddy – drums (2004)
 Jon Karel – drums (2008)

Former members
 Adam Crook – lead vocals (1998–2002)
 Risto Metso – vocals (1998–1999, 2000)
 Jason Roberts – bass (1998–1999)
 Guy Morgenshtern – bass (1999–2001)
 Andy Stokes – bass, backing vocals (2002–2004)
 Dashiell Arkenstone – bass (2004–2008)
 Brian Grover – bass (2009–2010)
 Jason Karuza – drums (1998–2000, 2001–2004)
 Eli Green – drums (2004–2006)
 Chris Prophet – drums (2006–2008)

Timeline

Discography

Studio albums

Extended plays

Video albums

Music videos 
 "Bunnies" - R. Borlax
 "A Million Exploding Suns" - The Mechanical Hand
 "Lord Gold Throneroom" - The Mechanical Hand
 "Birdo" - The Mechanical Hand
 "New York City" - A Natural Death
 "Murder" - A Natural Death
 "Shapeshift" - Desperate Living

References

External links 
 

Nintendocore musical groups
American post-hardcore musical groups
Electronicore musical groups
Musical groups established in 1998
Musical quintets
Roadrunner Records artists
1998 establishments in California
Chiptune musical groups
Metalcore musical groups from California